The Wife is a 2017 drama film directed by Björn L. Runge and written by Jane Anderson, based on the 2003 novel of the same name by Meg Wolitzer. It stars Glenn Close, Jonathan Pryce, and Christian Slater, and follows an aging woman (Close) who questions her life choices as she travels to Stockholm with her husband (Pryce), who is set to receive the Nobel Prize in Literature.

The film premiered at the 2017 Toronto International Film Festival on September 12, 2017, and was theatrically released in the United States on August 17, 2018, by Sony Pictures Classics. It received generally positive reviews from critics, with Close's performance garnering widespread acclaim. She won the Golden Globe Award, Screen Actors Guild Award, Independent Spirit Award and Critics' Choice Movie Award for Best Actress for her performance, and was also nominated for the Academy Award and BAFTA Award for Best Actress.

Plot
In 1958, young Joan Archer, a college student at Smith College, is awed by her professor Joseph Castleman, a handsome, young, married man, and his force of personality and advice. Later, Joan meets a published alumna female author whose cynical view of opportunities available to female writers disheartens her.

Two years later, Joseph has been fired for having an affair with Joan, his marriage is failing, and his first attempt at writing a novel turns out very poorly. Joan, a secretary at a publishing house, observes how the all-male editors dismiss women writers. When Joan criticizes Joseph's work, he threatens to end his relationship with her, claiming she cannot love "a hack." Joan agrees to fix Joseph's novel for him. The work, titled The Walnut, is published and becomes a bestseller. By 1968, Joseph and Joan are married and living in a large seaside home in Connecticut. Joan is hard at work on a novel to be published under Joseph's name, while Joseph supports her by cooking, cleaning, and caring for their first child, David. As Joseph and Joan converse, it is apparent that Joan's novel reflects their life together, which bores Joan. A narcissist, Joseph has several adulterous affairs over the next four decades and tells everyone that Joan "does not write".

By 1992, an elderly Joseph has become a celebrated author. He wins the Nobel Prize in Literature, about which Joan is less than happy. David, who idolizes his father but is unaware that Joan has written all of Joseph's books, seeks critique of his first short story. The trio flies to Stockholm as Nathaniel Bone, a biographer with a taste for scandal, tries to ingratiate himself with the Castlemans. Joan's unhappiness worsens as adulation is heaped on Joseph. His attempts to publicly thank her for supporting him embitter her further.

Nathaniel, sensing Joan's emotional state, induces her to talk with him over drinks and says that he knows that Joan has ghostwritten a major portion or even all of each of Joseph's novels. Joan does not admit the truth, but Nathaniel is convinced by their conversation that he is correct. Meanwhile, Joseph begins to seduce a young photographer assigned to him, but just as he begins his seduction, his watch alarm goes off for him to take his heart pills, cooling the moment, and she leaves the room. Joseph accuses Joan of abandoning him, while Joan expresses outrage over his attempted affair. The argument ceases when they learn that their daughter Susannah has given birth.

On the night of the Nobel ceremony, David confronts his parents after being told by Nathaniel that Joan is the only writer in the family. Joseph and Joan deny everything. At the ceremony and the banquet which follows, Joan feels increasingly humiliated because Joseph praises her as his support, his muse, his soul. She flees, and Joseph follows her. He demands that she take his prize, but she refuses. At their hotel, Joan tells Joseph she is divorcing him. They argue violently, and Joseph has a heart attack. Prostrate on the bed, he begs for Joan's love. She tells him she loves him; he calls her a good liar and dies moments later. On the Concorde flight back to the US, Nathaniel offers his condolences to Joan. She tells him that if he tries to print anything that undermines Joseph's reputation as a writer, she will sue him. David overhears her. Joan says she will tell David and his sister the truth when they get home. She then turns the page to the journal she had opened, runs her hand over a blank page, and looks up.

Cast
 Glenn Close as Joan Castleman
 Annie Starke as Joan Archer, Joan's younger self
 Jonathan Pryce as Professor Joseph Castleman
 Harry Lloyd as young Professor Joseph Castleman
 Christian Slater as Nathaniel Bone
 Max Irons as David Castleman
 Karin Franz Körlof as Linnea
 Johan Widerberg as Walter Bark
 Elizabeth McGovern as Elaine Mozell
 Alix Wilton Regan as Susannah Castleman

Production
On May 16, 2014, it was reported that Glenn Close would star in an adaptation of the Meg Wolitzer novel The Wife. The film was directed by Björn Runge and written by Jane Anderson. On January 30, 2015, Frances McDormand, Logan Lerman, Brit Marling, Jonathan Pryce, and Christian Slater were announced as having also been cast. On October 19, 2016, Pryce and Slater's involvement was confirmed, and Elizabeth McGovern, Max Irons, and Close's daughter Annie Starke joined the cast, playing the roles originally set with McDormand, Lerman, and Marling, respectively; Harry Lloyd was also added. Close approached Gary Oldman for the part of Joe Castleman but he was unavailable for the role. The Wife shot scenes in Glasgow, Edinburgh, and Arbigland Estate in Dumfries.

Reception

Box office
The Wife grossed $9.6 million in the United States and Canada, and $8.8 million in other territories, for a worldwide total of $18.4 million.

In its first weekend of limited release, The Wife grossed $111,137 from four theaters, for an average of $27,784, the best of the weekend. It expanded to 18 theaters in its second weekend, making $212,714.

Critical response

On review aggregator Rotten Tomatoes, the film holds an approval rating of 86% based on 232 reviews, and an average rating of 7.1/10. The website's critical consensus reads, "The Wife relies on the strength of Glenn Close's performance to drive home the power of its story—and she proves thoroughly, grippingly up to the task." On Metacritic, the film has a weighted average score of 77 out of 100, based on 36 critics, indicating "generally favorable reviews."

Peter Travers gave the film four out of five stars in Rolling Stone, calling Close's acting a "tour-de-force," and saying she "takes it to the next level with a powerfully implosive performance that doubles as an accumulation of details that define a marriage. She never telegraphs Joan’s feelings, letting them unravel slowly as we watch her attend parties as a buildup to the big night." The chief film critic for The Observer Mark Kermode described the movie as a "Stockholm syndrome with a twist," while Glenn Close, interviewed by Robbie Collin for The Daily Telegraph, described it as "part-period piece, part-love story, part-Bergmanesque drama—so much so the latter that it could have been called Scenes from a Marriage." Citing the screening coordinator Peggy Siegal, Bill McCuddy of the Gold Derby called The Wife "the perfect '#MeToo' film" and defined it as Oscar bait.

San Diego Reader writer Scott Marks gave the film one out of five stars and criticized the film's simplicity, writing: "It might not have been so bad had the road to the big reveal been paved with insight and originality, but other than the performances, there is nothing here audiences haven't seen more times than they have their own feet." Writing for the Chicago Reader, Ben Sachs wrote: "Because the performances are so calculated, the emotional outbursts on which the story hinges fail to make a dramatic impact. And for a film about a novelist, The Wife conveys very little sense of what it's like to read or write."

Accolades

References

External links

2017 films
2017 drama films
2017 independent films
Adultery in films
American drama films
American feminist films
British drama films
British feminist films
English-language Swedish films
English-language Scottish films
Films about fictional Nobel laureates
Films about marriage
Films about writers
Films based on American novels
Films directed by Björn Runge
Films featuring a Best Drama Actress Golden Globe-winning performance
Films scored by Jocelyn Pook
Films set in 1958
Films set in 1960
Films set in 1962
Films set in 1968
Films set in 1992
Films set in Connecticut
Films set in Massachusetts
Films set in Stockholm
Films shot in Edinburgh
Films shot in Glasgow
Ghostwriting in fiction
Sony Pictures Classics films
Swedish drama films
Scottish films
2010s English-language films
2010s American films
2010s British films
2010s Swedish films